The United States has participated in all editions of the Summer and Winter Universiade held since 1965. The United States is ranked first in the all-time medal table (second if the Soviet Union and Russia are combined).

Medal count

Summer Universiade

Winter Universiade

See also
United States at the Olympics
United States at the Paralympics
United States at the Pan American Games

References

External links
 FISU History at the FISU

 
Nations at the Universiade
College sports in the United States